Babulal Solanki is an Indian politician. He was elected to the Lok Sabha, lower house of the Parliament of India from Morena, Madhya Pradesh as a member of the Indian National Congress.

References

External links
 Official biographical sketch in Parliament of India website

Lok Sabha members from Madhya Pradesh
India MPs 1980–1984
Indian National Congress politicians
1949 births
Living people
Indian National Congress politicians from Madhya Pradesh